Tan Sri Datin Paduka Seri Hajah Zaleha binti Ismail (Jawi: صالحة بنت اسماعيل) (18 May 1936 – 14 November 2020) was a Malaysian politician and among the women's leaders in Malaysia. She served as Minister of National Unity and Community Development from 1995 to 1999. Her friendly attitude led many to enjoy it.

Background
She was born in Kuala Langat, Selangor. She attended the Sungai Pelek Malay School and University of Malaya – Bachelor of Arts (Economics) in 1961.

Career
At Radio Malaya (1962–1968) she worked as a Plan Assistant, then Manager of the English Service Plan. Additionally, she was a part-time Lecturer and Tutor at University of Malaya, while in 1968–1978 she became the Encyclopedia Officer in Dewan Bahasa dan Pustaka and subsequently the Deputy Head of Textbook Division.

Tan Sri Datin Paduka Hajah Zaleha Ismail as well as Vice President of MUBARAK, was a former Malaysian MP and President of the Malaysian Council for Children Welfare, Women's Association of the ASEAN Association of Women, and President of the National Council of Women's Organizations. She was also equally influential regionally and internationally, as she was elected President of the Association of Women's Organizations (ACWO) in 1986 until 1988.

Tan Sri Datin Paduka Zaleha continued to serve at ACWO even after she supported the president in various capacities such as vice president, Honorary Treasurer, and general secretary before being re-elected to lead ACWO as president in 1998 to 2000. She was also the Chairperson of the Population and Development Board Country Family in Malaysia. Tan Sri Datin Paduka Hajah Zaleha Ismail was the Chairperson of Global Peace Foundation Malaysia and Spark Capital Development Berhad.

Politics
In 1968 she became a regular member of UMNO and eventually the UMNO Supreme Council of Malaysia. She was involved in politics for 30 years. She started contesting the 1978 general election for the Permatang seat of Selangor State Legislative Assembly. She was Member of Parliament for Tanjong Karang (1982–1986) and Selayang (1986–1995) afterward. She continued to be Deputy Transport Minister from 1987 to 1995 when she became a member of parliament for Gombak (1995–2004). The peak of her career came as she took on the National Unity & Ministry of Social Development as Minister, from 1995 to 1999. In Malaysia's 1999 general election, she defeated Pan-Malaysian Islamic Party (PAS), Dr. Hatta Ramli with a majority of 803 votes.

Death
On 14 November 2020, Zaleha Ismail died of several health complications at 8.15 pm at Tawakkal Hospital, Kuala Lumpur. She was 84 years old.

Election results

Honours
She was awarded the Seri Mahkota Selangor Star, Bintang Kesatria Mangku Negara and Datuk Paduka Mahkota Selangor in 1979. Among the recent awards was the Global Peace Award in 2011, "Ibu Harmoni Tokoh" Award 2013 and Datin Paduka Seri Rosmah Mansor for Women leading in Amal.

Honours of Malaysia
  : 
  Officer of the Order of the Defender of the Realm (KMN) (1979)
  Commander of the Order of Loyalty to the Crown of Malaysia (PSM) – Tan Sri (2003)
  :
  Companion of the Order of the Crown of Selangor (SMS)
  Knight Commander of the Order of the Crown of Selangor (DPMS) – Datin Paduka (1980)
  Knight Grand Companion of the Order of Sultan Salahuddin Abdul Aziz Shah (SSSA)  – Datin Paduka Seri (2001)

References

1936 births
2020 deaths
People from Selangor
Malaysian people of Malay descent
Malaysian Muslims
United Malays National Organisation politicians
Members of the Dewan Rakyat
Women members of the Dewan Rakyat
Government ministers of Malaysia
Women government ministers of Malaysia
Members of the Selangor State Legislative Assembly
Women MLAs in Selangor
University of Malaya alumni
Commanders of the Order of Loyalty to the Crown of Malaysia
Officers of the Order of the Defender of the Realm
Knights Commander of the Order of the Crown of Selangor